Wyman is an unincorporated community in Wyman Township, Washington County, Arkansas, United States. It is located east of the White River, north of Lake Sequoyah, southwest of Goshen, and east of Fayetteville.

References

Unincorporated communities in Washington County, Arkansas
Unincorporated communities in Arkansas